This is a list of transactions that have taken place during the off-season and the 2018–19 WCBA season.

Front office movements

Head coach changes
Off-season

Player movement

Free agency

Going overseas

See also
2018–19 WCBA season
List of 2018–19 WCBA team rosters

References

External links
 WCBA Official Website (in Chinese)

Transactions
201819
2018–19 in Chinese basketball
Chn
Chn
basketball
basketball